Puicutuni (possibly from Aymara p'uykutu pitcher, earthenware jar with a large belly and a narrow throat, -ni a suffix to indicate ownership, "the one with a pitcher" or "the one with a p'uykutu") is a mountain in the Vilcanota mountain range in the Andes of Peru, about  high. It is located in the Cusco Region, Quispicanchi Province, Marcapata District, and in the Puno Region, Carabaya Province, Ollachea District. Puicutuni lies northeast of Llusca Ritti and Sullulluni. Quellocunca ("yellow throat") is the name of the ridge to the west.

References

Mountains of Cusco Region
Mountains of Puno Region
Mountains of Peru